Westminster Mall may refer to:
Westminster Mall (California), in Westminster, California
Westminster Mall (Colorado), in Westminster, Colorado
The Mall, London, located in the City of Westminster